Atomizer Geyser is a cone geyser in the Upper Geyser Basin (Old Faithful area) of Yellowstone National Park in the United States. Atomizer Geyser is part of the Cascade Group which also includes Artemisia Geyser. The geyser is named for a fine mist resembling the spray from an atomizer that is ejected during major eruptions.

Geology 
Atomizer has two 3 foot (1 m) tall cones. One of the cones is the jetting cone from which all water jets come. The other cone sprays a fine mist during major eruptions, giving the geyser its name. The geyser erupts in series. The series consists of three to five minor eruptions and one major eruption. Major eruptions last 8 to 10 minutes and reach . Major eruptions have a steam phase following the water phase.

Atomizer overflows its pool every few minutes for two to four hours until the first minor eruption occurs. Six to eight minor eruptions occur about one hour apart. Between 15 minutes and 1½ hours after the last minor eruption, the major eruption will begin. After a major eruption, the water pool takes about six hours to refill.

References

Geysers of Wyoming
Geothermal features of Teton County, Wyoming
Geothermal features of Yellowstone National Park
Geysers of Teton County, Wyoming